Spencerville is an unincorporated community and census-designated place in Montgomery County, Maryland, United States. Spencerville has a post office with ZIP code 20868.

Demographics

References

Census-designated places in Montgomery County, Maryland
Census-designated places in Maryland